Ismet Munishi (born 3 October 1974) is a Kosovo Albanian professional football coach and former player who is the current manager of the Prishtina.

Notes and references
Notes:

External links 
 
 
 
 Stats from Slovenia at PrvaLiga.
 

1974 births
Living people
People from Gjilan
Association football midfielders
Kosovan footballers
KF Flamurtari players
NK Maribor players
Turanspor footballers
ND Mura 05 players
NK Olimpija Ljubljana (1945–2005) players
Maccabi Herzliya F.C. players
NK Korotan Prevalje players
Kocaelispor footballers
NK Šmartno ob Paki players
KF Laçi players
FC Vorskla Poltava players
Besa Kavajë players
FC Tobol players
KF Trepça'89 players
KF Vëllaznimi players
Football Superleague of Kosovo players
Süper Lig players
Ukrainian Premier League players
Liga Leumit players
Kategoria Superiore players
Kosovan expatriate footballers
Expatriate footballers in Slovenia
Kosovan expatriates in Slovenia
Expatriate footballers in Turkey
Kosovan expatriate sportspeople in Turkey
Expatriate footballers in Israel
Kosovan expatriates in Israel
Expatriate footballers in Albania
Kosovan expatriates in Albania
Expatriate footballers in Ukraine
Kosovan expatriate sportspeople in Ukraine
Expatriate footballers in Kazakhstan
Kosovan expatriate sportspeople in Kazakhstan
Kosovan football managers
KF Vushtrria managers
FC Drita managers
KF Vëllaznimi managers
KF Feronikeli managers